Sati Sadhani was the legendary queen of the Chutia dynasty. 

According to tradition, she was the daughter of King Dharmadhwajpal, also known as Dhirnarayan. Born in Sadiya, she married Nityapal, alias Nitai. In 1524, the Ahoms took advantage  of Nityapal's weak leadership and attacked the kingdom, conquering Sadiya and killing Nityapal. When Sadhani, who played a prominent role in the fight against the Ahoms, was asked to marry Sadiyakhowa Gohain, the Ahom governor of Sadiya, she preferred death to dishonour and sacrificed her life by jumping from the top of Chandragiri hills near Sadiya in 1524.

Legend

Queen of Chutia kingdom

Sadhani was born in and around 1500 A.D. to king Dhirnarayan.  Being unable to find a suitable groom for Sadhani a Swayamvara was organised by the king. The king promised to marry Sadhani to any person who would be able to shoot down a running squirrel on the top of a tomb with an arrow. To everyone's surprise, it was a cow-herder named Nitai(from the Chakusara clan) who was able to kill the squirrel. The king kept his promise and married off the princess to Nitai who was since then given the name Nitipal. She was made queen at an early age in the year 1522 AD, after the Chutia king had won the battle of Mungkhrang(Dihingmukh) fort(near present-day Mahuramukh in Bokakhat) in 1520 AD by defeating and killing the Ahom general Khenmung. As per epigraphic evidence, Dhirnarayan made a land grant to Brahmins in the same year at Dhakuakhana region of Lakhimpur. It is believed that it was after this, that Sadhani was made queen. The king retired to the hills leaving the throne to Nitipal and Sadhani.

Nitipal's weak rule

In 1522, Dhirnarayan due to his growing age passed down his throne to Nityapal. The Chutia nobilities and ministers resisted the decision of giving away the throne to Nityapal. Being a cow herder before becoming king, Nitipal was an inefficient king. He didn't have any idea how to rule over a kingdom and it was Sadhani who had to take charge. Nitipal dismissed all the old wise ministers and instead recruited his own friends from his village as his ministers. This resulted in a rebellion within the kingdom by the old ministers which was led by the brother of the former king named Surdhwajpal. But, it was crushed soon. Due to this chaos spread in the kingdom, the Chutia chiefs of other areas like Dhemaji, Lakhimpur and Biswanath became independent. Nitipal was popularly known as A-nitipal because of this inefficiency and recklessness. Sadiya was solitary and had no contact to any of the chutia chiefs of the other parts of the kingdom. In the same year, Suhungmung came near the Nongkongmung lake and sent his men to attack the Chutias in Dihingmukh. The Borgohain took leadership in the battle and pushed the Chutias northwards from Shup-Nam-Jon(Dihingmukh). He sent a general named Lashaitai to meet the king, in a bor-nao (boat) obtained from the Chutias. By that time, Suhungmung had come to a place named Cheruakata (Majuli). Suhungmung met Lashaitai and enquired him about the status at Dihingmukh. He said that the Chutias had assembled at a place near the Brahmaputra (Ti-lao) and on the waters of Shup-Tiphao (Dibrumukh). The Ahom king didn't attack the Chutias straight away. In the month of Kati (1523 AD), as per Suhungmung's orders Phrasengmung Borgohain and general Klinglun (Buragohain) with their whole force, proceeded to the mouth of the Dibru river and constructed a fort (Dibrugarh) there. Suhungmung returned to Charaideo and offered sacrifices to the gods. In the month of Aghun of 1523 AD , he stationed his forces at Shup-Shing-sa(Sessamukh). Nitipal learning about the Dibrumukh invasion advanced from Sadiya to Larupara(Chabua). From there, he sent his general Bura Barua to Dibrugarh to fight with the invaders. At the same time, Suhungmung with his entire army proceeded to Dibrugarh to support the ministers. Phrasengmung Borgohain and Klinglun Buragohain assembled together and attacked the Chutia naval forces. The Chutia naval generals in this battle were Kasitara, Chuluki Chetia and Borpatra. The Chutia army was routed. The next morning Suhungmung with all his generals penetrated as far as Sonari (Kakopathar). Nitipal sent Katakis (messengers) to the Ahom king along with gifts which included gold bedstead (ku), gold earrings (khao), golden coloured cloth (kham-sin), copper basket (tong-ru-khang) and Gilted cloth Panikamoli (phra-nun-phun), Xorai, Pati in order to settle for peace. In reply, Suhungmung asked for the Chutia royal heirloom (gold and silver cat, gold and silver umbrella, royal bedstead and scepter) along with ten male elephants, one female elephant and a girl. Nitipal agreed on sending the elephants and the girl, but did not give the royal heirloom as it belonged to his ancestors. Instead, after a month, he sent other gifts like gold and silver-gilded Jaapi (Kham-Ngiu-Kup), gold ring (Khup-kham), gold basket(Liu-kham), gold umbrella(Chang-kham), gold bookstand (Khu-tin-kham), golden bracelets (Mao-kham), elephants, horses, ivory-mats, knives and Panikamoli cloth and started building a fort on the banks of Lohit river. The Ahom king having not received any royal heirloom became angry. He took the gift of knives and the building of the fort as a sign of war and attacked Sadiya during Bohag month of 1524.

The attack on Sadiya

The Sadiya attack took place in the year 1524 A.D. on the first day(first Wednesday) of Chutia Bisu/Bihu which was 16th April in 1524. This day is reserved for the Bor-bali(grand sacrifice). It is still practiced today in Sadiya. On this day, no other person is allowed to carry weapons besides the Deori priests. The invaders very well knew this fact. At that time, Chutias were the only people in the region who possessed firearms like Hiloi(guns) and Bortop(cannons) and Hiloi-tula chara-nao(cannon-boats). So, the invaders very well knew that a frontal attack was never possible. So, they planned a sudden attack on this very day. The Chutia king Nitipal was busy in building a tank at that time. The invaders attacked the fort and the capital when the entire city was busy celebrating Bisu. There was hardly any resistance provided by the Chutias in the fort.

Last battle at Chandangiri

The sudden attack at Sadiya (referred to as Che-lung or Barnagar) during Bihu forced the king and queen along with some of the soldiers who survived, to flee to the hills situated above Sadiya. Kasitora (mentioned as Kaitora) was chased by the Dhanudhari Gohain (Chao-Song-Kung-Rin) Klangseng and a battle was fought in Doithang hill. The king and his men took shelter in Chandangiri hill(Doi-Chantan). The Chutias attacked valiantly against the invaders from the hills. They applied gurella warfare strategies and used Faakdhenu (crossbows) and spears. The army killed hundreds of enemies. As per Buranjis, Queen Sadhani was pregnant at that time and also had a young son. Despite this, she formed a female fighting squad of 120 warriors. They assisted the army by rolling big boulders onto the enemy below. The invaders were unable to do anything. Thus, they formed a strategy and decided to attack the hill from three directions. That day was 21 April (7th Bohag) and was widely considered as Ujha (Drummer's) Bisu. Therefore, one of the former ministers of the Chutias whom Nitipal had removed sided with the Ahoms and suggested the Ahom commander Phrasengmung Borgohain to play the Dhol. Thus‌ the general ordered some captives to climb up Ghila creepers and play the Bihu drum or Dhol. As it was the season of Bihu, the Chutia army took it to be a sign that re-enforcements had arrived from other parts and that the Ahoms were chased out. So, thinking the drum beats to be a signal of victory, they came down to the lower hills where the enemies were hiding. Another former Chutia commander named Gajraj Borua who had sided with the Ahoms showed the enemies the exact way to the location where the king was hiding. The king and his son was attacked and killed by an arrow while Sadhani fought till her last breath at the end sacrificing her life by jumping from a hill.

Aftermath

After killing the Chutia royals, Chao-Cheng-Kung-rin Klangseng offered the severed head of the Chutia king Nitipal, his son and Kasitora to Suhungmung in Sadiya. As per Assam Buranji(SM), Sadhani's gold waist band was removed from her dead body and brought to the temple at Sadiya. Seeing this some Chutias attacked the Ahom forces and killed one Phang-teng Deodhai. Nothing is mentioned about Sadhani(called as Nang-lung or chief queen in Buranjis) at this stage in other Buranjis. Phrasengmung Borgohain was given three hundred men along with three elephants and stationed at Sadiya. To strengthen the rule, the Ahoms set up colonies in Sadiya as well as on the banks of the Dihing river. The Ahom king then returned to Charaideo, performed the Rikkvan ceremony and ordered the heads of the Chutia royals to be buried at the base of the stairs attached to the Deoghars. A new capital was built in Bakata on the banks of Dihing river. A number of Brahmins, artisans like blacksmiths(Komar), goldsmiths(Sonari), potter(Kumar), weavers(Tanti), masons (Khanikar), carpenter (Barhoi) were deported from Sadiya to the new capital. A lot of precious articles and valuable products were recovered from the Chutia country and sent via boats through the Dihing river to the capital. These included gold dishes (Maihang), royal palanquin (Kekura-Dola), the gold throne (Hunor tinisukia hinghakhan), gold bedstead (Khat), gold kettles (Bhug-jara), gold foot-tub (Bela) gold embroidered wicker hats (Jaapi), gold spittoon(Pikdan), royal shade (Aruwan), big-drums (Doba), trumpets (Kali) gun-boats (Hiloi-chara-nao), weapons like hand-cannons (Hiloi), large cannons ( Mithahulung), Chutia bow (Faak-dhenu), Long-bow (Bor-dhenu), spears (Baru-barsa) as well as cattle, elephants and horses. Upon annexing the Chutia territories, the Ahoms came in contact with hill tribes like Miris, Abors, Mishmis and Daflas. The newly acquired territories were divided among the Buragohain and Borgohain, while new offices were created to administer the country more efficiently. These included Thao-mung Mung-teu (Bhatialia Gohain) with headquarters at Habung (Lakhimpur), Thao-mung Ban-lung(Banlungia Gohain) at Banlung (Dhemaji), Thao-mung Mung-klang(Dihingia gohain) at Dihing (Dibrugarh, Majuli and northern Sibsagar), Chaolung Shuling at Tiphao (northern Dibrugarh). In 1527, a new ministerial position named Borpatrogohain was created (borrowed from the Chutia Vrihat-patra), and Klangseng(previously posted as Bhatialia Gohain) was given charge.

Divas

Every year in Assam, 21 April is celebrated as Sati Sadhani divas to honor the sacrifices made by the Sutiya Queen. The Government of Assam marked this day a state holiday.

Award
 
The Sati Sadhani award was established by the Sutiya Jati Unnayan Parishad. The award is given to someone with outstanding contributions to the field of art, culture and literature. The honoree is selected by a committee formed by the Parishad.

See also

 Chutia kingdom
 Chutia people

References

Legendary Indian people
Indian female royalty
Kingdoms of Assam
People from Dhemaji district
Indian torture victims
16th-century Indian monarchs
16th-century Indian women
16th-century Indian people
1523 deaths
Year of birth unknown
Women from Assam
People from Tinsukia district
Women in 16th-century warfare
Indian women in war
Chutiya community
Hindu monarchs